Bobby Slowik (born June 9, 1987) is an American football coach who is the offensive coordinator for the Houston Texans of the National Football League (NFL). He previously has served as an assistant coach for the Washington Redskins and San Francisco 49ers.

Playing career

Bobby Slowik attended Michigan Tech University and played wide receiver for the Huskies in 2006, 2007, and 2008. Slowik started 10 games at wide receiver in 2008, recording 43 receptions for 603 yards and 4 touchdowns.

Coaching career

Washington Redskins

After spending the 2010 season as a video assistant, Slowik accepted his first NFL coaching position as a defensive assistant with the Washington Redskins in 2011 under head coach Mike Shanahan. Slowik remained on the coaching staff as a defensive assistant through the 2013 NFL season, after which Mike Shanahan was fired and Slowik was not retained.

San Francisco 49ers

Following his stint with the Redskins, Slowik spent 2014 through 2016 as an analyst with PFF. Following that stint, Slowik joined the San Francisco 49ers as a defensive quality control coach under head coach Kyle Shanahan in 2017 and 2018. For the 2019 and 2020 NFL seasons, however, Slowik moved to the offensive side of the ball as an offensive assistant. In 2021, upon the departure of offensive passing game coordinator Mike LaFleur, Slowik took on new responsibilities as the offensive passing game specialist. In 2022, Slowik was promoted to offensive passing game coordinator.

Houston Texans
Slowik was hired as the offensive coordinator for the Houston Texans on February 12, 2023 by new head coach DeMeco Ryans, who Slowik had previously worked with in San Francisco.

Personal life 

Bobby Slowik is the son of Bob Slowik, who currently serves as a defensive assistant for the Montreal Alouettes of the CFL and previously served as the defensive coordinator of the Chicago Bears, Cleveland Browns, Green Bay Packers, and Denver Broncos.

References

1987 births
Washington Redskins coaches
San Francisco 49ers coaches
American football wide receivers
Michigan Tech Huskies football players
Michigan Tech Huskies football coaches
Living people
National Football League offensive coordinators